The inscrutability or indeterminacy of reference (also referential inscrutability) is a thesis by 20th century analytic philosopher Willard Van Orman Quine in his book Word and Object. The main claim of this theory is that any given sentence can be changed into a variety of other sentences where the parts of the sentence will change in what they reference, but they will nonetheless maintain the meaning of the sentence as a whole. The referential relation is inscrutable, because it is subject to the background language and ontological commitments of the speaker.

Overview 
Along with the holophrastic indeterminacy, the inscrutability of reference is the second kind of indeterminacy that makes up Quine's thesis about the indeterminacy of (radical) translation. While the inscrutability of reference concerns itself with single words, Quine does not want it to be used for propositions, as he attacks those in another way. He challenges the translation or referential scrutability of whole sentences, proposing his idea of the indeterminacy of translation. In order to accomplish this, Quine makes the statement that there is a so-called holophrastic indeterminacy, which tells that there are always multiple translations of one sentence,  . This theory, linked with the inscrutability of reference make up the main characteristics of the indeterminacy of translation.

The inscrutability of reference can also be used in a more extended way, in order to explain Quine's theory of ontological relativity. We are told that, if we try to determine what the referential object of a certain word is, our answer will always be relative to our own background language. Now, as Quine sees it, this idea is not only limited to language, but applies also for scientific questions and philosophical ones. For example, if we are proposed a philosophical theory, we can never definitely characterize the ontological commitments of it. Because of this theory, Quine was often regarded as a relativist, or even a scientific skepticist. He, however, insisted that he belongs in neither of these categories, and some authors see in the inscrutability of reference an underdetermination of relativism.

Illustration by the use of gavagai 
In his indeterminacy of translation theory Quine claims that, if one is to translate a language, there are always several alternative translations, of which none is more correct than the other. A radical translation is therefore impossible. As a special part of this theory the inscrutability of reference indicates that, in trying to find out to which object a certain word (also sentence, sign etc.) of a language refers, there is never only one single possibility. That is even the case, if the possibilities that come into consideration lie very close together. Quine's example of the word gavagai is used to illustrate this. Note that it is also applied at the indeterminacy of translation, but has traditionally been introduced to point up referential inscrutability. The gavagai thought experiment tells about a linguist, who tries to find out, what the expression gavagai means, when uttered by a speaker of a yet unknown, native language upon seeing a rabbit. At first glance, it seems that gavagai simply translates with rabbit. Now, Quine points out that the background language and its referring devices might fool the linguist here, because he is misled in a sense that he always makes direct comparisons between the foreign language and his own. However, when shouting gavagai, and pointing at a rabbit, the natives could as well refer to something like undetached rabbit-parts, or rabbit-tropes and it would not make any observable difference. The behavioural data the linguist could collect from the native speaker would be the same in every case, or to reword it, several translation hypotheses could be built on the same sensoric stimuli. Hence, the reference between the term gavagai and its referring object is language- or framework-dependent, and therefore inscrutable. Quine regards this discovery as trivial, because it is already a widely accepted fact that all the different things one word might refer to can be switched out, because of their proxy functions.

Quine does not want to show that those native speakers might speak in interestingly different ways and we cannot know about it, but rather that there is nothing to be known. Not only is it impossible to discern, by any method, the correct translation and referential relation of gavagai, but, in fact, there is not even a correct answer to this question. To make sense of the word gavagai either way, the linguist simply has to assume that the native speaker does not refer to complicated terms like rabbits-tropes. The finding, then, that gavagai means rabbit is not really a translation, but merely a common sense interpretation.

It is important to note that indeterminacy and inscrutability not only occur in the course of translating something from a native, unknown language into a familiar one, but among every language. This holds also for languages which are quite similar, like German and Dutch, and even for speakers of the same language. One cannot with certainty say, what exactly one's conversational partner refers to, when that person is talking about a rabbit. We commonly use the homophonic rule in those cases, i.e., if an individual utters rabbit, we assume the individual uses it in the same way we do. But, as has been shown, there are multiple possibilities which can be indistinguishable from one another. This also applies in our own case. We ourselves do not know what it is we are referring to in using the word rabbit, that is because there is, in Quine's word, no fact of the matter at all. One must not, however, use different possible referential objects in the same translation, because they are incommensurable and the resulting translation hypothesis would contain logical fallacies.

Anti-realist interpretation 
Hilary Putnam uses Quine's thesis about the inscrutability of reference to challenge the traditional Realist's view that there is a mind-independent world to which our propositional attitudes refer (e.g. when we talk about or think of something, these things exist not in our minds, but in said mind-independent world). This traditional view implies a correspondence theory of truth and might simply be called Realism about Being. While Michael Dummett already tried to show that the correspondence theory fails to obtain in some particular cases, Hilary Putnam is far more radical, for he claims that this theory fails in every case it is tried to be applied. On Putnam's account, the idea that we refer with our sentences and statements to a mind-independent, nonlinguistic world is an illusion. Further he claims that the problem to deal with is a language philosophical one and uses Quine's inscrutability of reference theory to clarify his point of view. He suggests, that, because the referential objects of a language are always inscrutable, the Realist's idea of a mind-independent world is fallacious, because it presupposes distinct referential relations from language to objects in the mind-independent world.

Application in the sorites paradox 
The inscrutability of reference is also used in the sorites paradox. The classic example for the sorites paradox mentions a heap of wheat grains from which grains are taken away one by one, until at one time there's only a single grain left. This raises the question of where the line is to be drawn concerning what constitutes a heap. How long does the heap remain a heap? Are two grains still a heap? When one is talking about a heap, one obviously lacks any proper definition of it ready at hand. The referential object of heap is inscrutable, in the sense that there is no such thing and it is not even necessary for the use of the term heap.

See also 
 Indeterminacy of translation
 Metonymy
 Opaque context

Notes

References
Quine, Willard Van Orman: Word and Object (Cambridge, Mass.: MIT Press, 1960)
Keskinen, Antti: The Problem of Referential Meaning In Quine's Philosophy of Language (pdf) 
Nuccetelli, Susana and Seay, Gary: Philosophy of Language. The Central Topics, eds. (Rowman & Littlefield, 2007)
Williams, John Robert Gareth: The Inscrutability of Reference (2005, pdf)

20th-century philosophy
Philosophy of language
Willard Van Orman Quine